CLG Naomh Anna, Leitir Moir is a Gaelic Athletic Association club based in the Gaeltacht area of Leitir Móir, County Galway, Ireland. The club is a member of the Galway GAA. Notable former players include Fiachra Breathnach, and Antoine 'Toto' Ó Griofa, former members of the Galway Gaelic Football Squad

In 2009/10 the club enjoyed the most successful year in their history, capturing the Galway Intermediate Football Championship and also the Connacht Intermediate Club title. Naomh Anna, Leitir Móir eventually lost out to Cookstown Fr. Rock's from Tyrone in the All-Ireland series on 24 January 2010 at Pearse Park, Longford.

On the 13th November 2021, the club won the Galway Intermediate Football Championship, defeating Dunmore in an enthralling final at Pearse Stadium, Salthill

2009 squad

Honours
Connacht Intermediate Club Football Championship: 1
2010  Runners-Up 2021
Galway Intermediate Football Championship: 3
1995, 2009, 2021
Galway Intermediate Football League (West): 2
1993, 2001
Galway Intermediate Football Shield (West): 3
1999, 2002, 2006
 Comórtas Peile na Gaeltachta Champions (Junior)
1987

References

External links
 Official CLG Naomh Anna, Leitir Móir Club website

Gaelic football clubs in County Galway
Gaelic games clubs in County Galway